Hillhouse Capital Group is a global private equity firm with an East Asian heritage. Hillhouse was founded by Lei Zhang in 2005 with initial seed capital from the Yale University endowment and invests across East Asia, Southeast Asia, North America, and Europe. Hillhouse is headquartered in Singapore and maintains offices in Beijing, Hong Kong, London, New York City and Shanghai.

Hillhouse's assets under management ("AUM") were US$73.3 billion as of July 2021. As of October 2021, Hillhouse is the largest private equity fund operating in Asia with the completion of fundraising for its US$18 billion fifth flagship private equity fund breaking the previous record set by KKR's US$15 billion pan-Asia private equity fund raised that same year.

Hillhouse manages capital for institutional clients such as university endowments, foundations, sovereign wealth funds, pension funds, and family offices and is known for its avoidance of publicity. Hillhouse is a long-term fundamental research-driven equity investor, investing in all equity stages in sectors including technology, consumer, healthcare, and financials services.

History

Lei Zhang founded Hillhouse Capital Group in June 2005 with an initial US$20 million of seed capital from the Yale University endowment through David Swensen, Yale's Chief Investment Officer at the time. In reference to its historical ties with the Yale endowment, the company is named after Hillhouse Avenue in New Haven, one block from where the Yale University investment office was previously located. According to the Financial Times, Zhang built Hillhouse by being one of the first investment firms to back China's burgeoning internet sector, including investing in Tencent Holdings, a large internet company. Hillhouse was also one of the first firms to invest in JD.com, the e-commerce company.

By 2017, the firm had participated in more private equity acquisitions in the Asia-Pacific region than any other private equity firm, totaling $26 billion worth of transactions. GaoTeng Global Asset Management, a partnership between Tencent Holdings and Hillhouse, launched GaoTeng Asian Income Fund in November 2018, to focus on investing in government and corporate bonds.

In 2020, Hillhouse spun off its venture capital unit into an independent fund. The new fund is called GL Ventures. As of 2020, Hillhouse was an investor in companies such as Airwallex. In 2021, among Hillhouse Capital Management's investments were Xtep, JD Health International, Miniso Group Holding, XPeng, Pinduoduo, BeiGene, and Zoom Video Communications. Hillhouse Capital was nearing raising US$18 billion to back three new funds in May 2021, higher than the projected $13 billion in April 2021, according to reports, with $10 billion to be allocated to buyouts, and the rest "split between growth equity and venture." The company at the time was managing $100 billion. In August 2021 Hillhouse completed fundraising for its fifth flagship private equity investment fund at US$18 billion, the largest amount of capital raised by any private equity firm in Asia and breaking the previous record set by KKR's US$15 billion pan-Asia private equity fund also raised in 2021.

In 2021, the Financial Times referred to Hillhouse Capital as a "technology private equity investor." In 2022, it invested in J&T Express, a delivery company, and it also invested in EventX, a company in Hong Kong, through its early-stage investment arm GL Ventures.

In 2022, Hillhouse started its first real estate-focused fund with a total investment of more than $2 billion. The fund was called the Hillhouse Real Asset Opportunities Fund (RAOF).

Performance

Hillhouse's rapid growth stemmed from its investing track record, with up to 52% annualized returns from inception until 2012 and continued strong performance as the firm scaled.

Notable investments

Tencent Holdings Ltd: Some original $20 million provided from Yale was invested in Tencent Holdings in 2005. It was Hillhouse's earliest investment and one of their most profitable.

JD.com: Hillhouse was also an early investor in JD.com. At the time of the listing of JD.com on NASDAQ in May 2014, the company was valued at $26 billion. Hillhouse's original $255 million investment was, at the time of the IPO, valued at $3.9 billion.

Blue Moon: Hillhouse invested in Blue Moon, a liquid detergent maker, in 2010 as its only outside institutional investor. In 2013, Blue Moon was ranked #1 in the China Brand Power Index published by Ministry of Industry and Information Technology. The market share of its liquid detergent has been ranked #1 in China for the past eight consecutive years, from 2010 until 2018.

Belle International: In July 2017 Hillhouse purchased for $6.8 billion the largest women's Chinese footwear company, Belle International Holdings Ltd.

Global Logistic Properties: Hillhouse, together with Hopu Investment Management, purchased Singapore-based warehouse operator Global Logistic Properties in 2017 for $12 billion. At the time, that was the largest buyout of an Asian company.

Little Freddie: In 2018 Hillhouse began investing in the food sector, including organic baby food and snack manufacturer Little Freddie; a Californian craft beer maker and a pet food brand.

Miniso: In October 2018 Hillhouse and Tencent signed a strategic investment agreement with Japanese-style retailer Miniso worth RMB 1 billion ($145.6 million).

Philips Domestic Appliances: In August 2021 Hillhouse closed the deal of acquisition of the Domestic Appliances business of Philips.

Joint ventures

Hillhouse established an exclusive joint venture focused on China with the US healthcare provider, Mayo Clinic. Hillhouse works with the Mayo organization to expand its healthcare outreach in China.

In November 2017 Peet's Coffee China, a partnership between Hillhouse Capital and San Francisco-based Peet's Coffee, opened the first Peet's Coffee roastery in Shanghai.

Investment philosophy

Hillhouse does deep and fundamental research on industries and business models, and applies the value investing philosophy in local contexts while investing in different geographies.

According to the Financial Times, Hillhouse will often bring together leaders of their portfolio companies to share insights, believing that it is beneficial for executives to learn from one another.

When it comes to buyout investments in traditional industries Hillhouse has argued that technological innovation can be harnessed for job creation, saying that technology can act as an "equalizer" as opposed to a "disruptor."

Hillhouse also believes that China's business model can be applied to other emerging markets and is therefore bringing that model to developing nations in Asia, such as in Indonesia where Hillhouse launched a joint venture between mobile messaging platform WeChat and Indonesia's giant communications and media conglomerate, Global Mediacom.

Notable investors

According to the Wall Street Journal, Stanford University pledged to invest about US$200 million with Hillhouse in August 2015. With Stanford's investment, the firm manages "money for at least six of the 10 wealthiest universities in the U.S."

The other university investors in Hillhouse include Princeton University, Massachusetts Institute of Technology, University of Pennsylvania, University of Texas, and Yale University.

CPPIB committed US$200 million to Fund II in 2014, US$300 million to Fund III in 2016 and US$300 million to Fund IV in 2018.

References

External links

"Lei Zhang's Lecture" at Columbia Business School; notes by Zong Z. Peng via market folly.com, 29 July 2015.

Chinese companies established in 2005
Companies of Singapore
Investment management companies of Singapore
Private equity firms of Singapore
Venture capital firms of Singapore
Financial services companies established in 2008